Richland Township is one of the twelve townships of Defiance County, Ohio, United States. The 2010 census found 2,920 people in the township, 1,201 of whom lived in the city of Defiance, and 1,719 of whom lived in the unincorporated portions of the township.

Geography
Located in the eastern part of the county, it borders the following townships:
Adams Township - north
Napoleon Township, Henry County - northeast corner
Flatrock Township, Henry County - east
Pleasant Township, Henry County - southeast corner
Highland Township - south
Defiance Township - southwest
Noble Township - west
Tiffin Township - northwest

A small part of the county seat of Defiance is located in western Richland Township.

Name and history
Richland Township was established in 1824. It is one of twelve Richland Townships statewide.

Government
The township is governed by a three-member board of trustees, who are elected in November of odd-numbered years to a four-year term beginning on the following January 1. Two are elected in the year after the presidential election and one is elected in the year before it. There is also an elected township fiscal officer, who serves a four-year term beginning on April 1 of the year after the election, which is held in November of the year before the presidential election. Vacancies in the fiscal officership or on the board of trustees are filled by the remaining trustees.

Transportation
U.S. Route 24 travels from northeast to southwest through the northern half of Richland Township.  Other major roads in the township include:
State Route 18, which travels from southeast to west through the southern half of the township
State Route 281, which travels from east to west through the center of the township, and is concurrent with State Route 18 for a short time
State Route 424, which travels along the north bank of the Maumee River through the center of the township

References

External links
County website

Townships in Defiance County, Ohio
Townships in Ohio